Serena Williams and Venus Williams were the defending champions, but did not compete this year.

Martina Hingis and Mary Pierce won the title, defeating Virginia Ruano Pascual and Paola Suárez 6–2, 6–4 in the final.

Seeds

Draw

Finals

Top half

Section 1

Section 2

Bottom half

Section 3

Section 4

External links
 Official Results Archive (WTA)
2000 French Open – Women's draws and results at the International Tennis Federation

Women's Doubles
French Open by year – Women's doubles
French Open - Women's Doubles
French Open - Doubles
French Open - Doubles